Juliet Rylance (born Juliet van Kampen; 26 July 1979) is an English actress and producer, known for her roles in  The Knick and McMafia and Perry Mason.

Early life
Rylance was born as Juliet van Kampen in Hammersmith, London, to Claire van Kampen, a composer, and Chris van Kampen, an architect. Her younger sister, Nataasha (who died in 2012), became a filmmaker.

Her parents divorced when she was seven, and her mother subsequently married actor Mark Rylance, whose surname she adopted. She trained at the Royal Academy of Dramatic Art.

Career
Her first major role upon leaving RADA was as Medea in Neil LaBute's Bash: Latter-Day Plays at the Union Theatre in London. She then went on to play Perdita in The Winter's Tale and Cressida in Troilus and Cressida at Shakespeare's Globe Theatre. She portrayed British writer Mary Sidney in I Am Shakespeare, written by her step-father Mark Rylance and directed by Matthew Warchus at the Chichester Festival Theatre and its UK tour. That same year, along with two of her contemporaries, David Sturzaker and director Tamara Harvey, she started her own production company, Theater of Memory. She subsequently starred in the Theater of Memory's productions of Romeo and Juliet and Bash: Latter-Day Plays, portraying Juliet and Medea respectively.

In 2009, Rylance played Desdemona in New York City, in Othello, for which she was nominated for a Lucille Lortel Award. She next appeared in the Sam Mendes-directed Bridge Project, a joint venture between the Brooklyn Academy of Music in Brooklyn and The Old Vic in London. She appeared as Rosalind and Miranda, respectively, with her husband appearing alongside her as Orlando and Ariel. Rylance was awarded a 2010 Obie Award for her performance as Rosalind.

In 2012, Rylance co-starred in the horror film Sinister. In 2013 she appeared in and produced the film Days and Nights, based on the Anton Chekov play The Seagull, and written and directed by her husband.

From 2014 to 2015, she starred in the Cinemax medical drama The Knick. She appears as Della Street in the 2020 HBO series Perry Mason, based on the detective stories by Erle Stanley Gardner.

Personal life
In 2008, Rylance married actor Christian Camargo at New York City Hall. They had met when he worked with her stepfather, Mark Rylance, at Shakespeare's Globe Theatre.

Filmography

Film

Television

Theatre

Awards and nominations

References

External links
 

Living people
English stage actresses
Obie Award recipients
People from Hammersmith
Alumni of RADA
Actresses from London
21st-century English actresses
English film actresses
English television actresses
1979 births
British people of Dutch descent